The 2000 Regal Scottish Masters was a professional non-ranking snooker tournament which took place from 24 to 29 October. The tournament was played at the Motherwell Civic Centre, Scotland, and featured twelve professional players.

Ronnie O'Sullivan won the tournament for the second time, defeating Stephen Hendry 9–6 in the final. Marco Fu recorded his first maximum break in his first round match with Ken Doherty. This was the first ever 147 streamed live on the Internet.

Main draw

Qualifying Event
Qualifying for the tournament took place amongst 12 players at the Spencer's Snooker Centre from 18 to 22 September 2000. Jimmy White dropped only four frames throughout the event as he won the tournament and earned the final wild card spot for the Scottish Masters by defeating Stephen Maguire, Drew Henry and Joe Swail over three rounds. All matches were played to the best-of-nine frames and players in bold indicate match winners.

References

Scottish Masters
2000 in snooker
2000 in Scottish sport